In mathematics, Lüroth's theorem asserts that every field that lies between two other fields K and K(X) must be generated as an extension of K by a single element of K(X). This result is named after Jacob Lüroth, who proved it in 1876.

Statement
In other words, every

Proofs
The proof of Lüroth's theorem can be derived easily from the theory of rational curves, using the geometric genus.
This method is non-elementary, but several short proofs using only the basics of field theory have long been known.
Many of these simple proofs use Gauss's lemma on primitive polynomials as a main step.

References

Algebraic varieties
Birational geometry
Field (mathematics)
Theorems in algebraic geometry